The human skeleton of an adult consists of around 206 bones, depending on the counting of sternum (which may alternatively be included as the manubrium, body of sternum, and the xiphoid process). It is composed of 270 bones at the time of birth, but later decreases to 206: 80 bones in the axial skeleton and 126 bones in the appendicular skeleton. Many small accessory bones, such as sesamoid bones, are not included in this count.

Introduction
As a person ages, some bones fuse, a process which typically lasts until sometime within the third decade of life. Therefore, the number of bones in an individual may be evaluated differently throughout a lifetime. In addition, the bones of the skull and face are counted as separate bones, despite being fused naturally. Some reliable sesamoid bones such as the pisiform are counted, while others, such as the hallux sesamoids, are not.

Individuals may have more or fewer bones than the average (even accounting for developmental stage) owing to anatomical variations. The most common variations include sutural (wormian) bones, which are located along the sutural lines on the back of the skull, and sesamoid bones which develop within some tendons, mainly in the hands and feet. Some individuals may also have additional (i.e., supernumerary) cervical ribs or lumbar vertebrae. Amputations or other injuries may result in the loss of bones. Complete bone fractures may split one bone into multiple pieces. Other genetic conditions may result in abnormally higher (e.g. polydactyly or conjoined twins) or lower (e.g. oligodactyly) counts of bones.

Bones

The axial skeleton, comprising the spine, chest and head, contains 80 bones. The appendicular skeleton, comprising the arms and legs, including the shoulder and pelvic girdles, contains 126 bones, bringing the total for the entire skeleton to 206 bones. Infants are born with about 270 bones with most of it being cartilage, but will later fuse together and decrease over time to 206 bones.

Spine (vertebral column)

A fully grown adult features 26 bones in the spine, whereas a child can have 34.
 Cervical vertebrae (7 bones)
 Thoracic vertebrae (12 bones)
 Lumbar vertebrae (5 bones)
 Sacrum (5 bones at birth, fused into one after adolescence)
 Coccygeal vertebrae/Cordal (set of 4 bones at birth; some or all fuse together, but there seems to be a disagreement between researchers as to what the most common number should be. Some say the most common is 1, others say 2 or 3, with 4 being the least likely. It is counted as 1 in this article.)

Chest (thorax)

There are 25 bones in the chest. The chest contains cartilage for the lungs to fill with air. 
Sternum (1 or 3 bones. It is counted as 1 in this article.)
 Ribs (24, in 12 pairs)
  Cervical ribs are extra ribs that occur in some people.

Head
There are 23 bones in the skull. Including the bones of the middle ear and the hyoid bone, the head contains 29 bones.
 Cranial bones (8)
 Occipital bone
 Parietal bones (2)
 Frontal bone
 Temporal bones (2)
 Sphenoid bone (sometimes counted as facial)
 Ethmoid bone (sometimes counted as facial)
 Facial bones (15)
Nasal bones (2)
 Maxillae (upper jaw) (2)
 Lacrimal bone (2)
Zygomatic bone (cheek bones) (2)
Palatine bone (2)
Inferior nasal concha (2)
Vomer (1)
Hyoid bone (1)
Mandible (1)
 Middle ears (6 bones in total, 3 on each side)
 Malleus (2)
 Incus (2)
 Stapes (2)

Upper limb (arm and forearm) and hand
There are a total of 64 bones in the arms, 32 in each arm
 Upper arm bones (6 bones in total; 3 on each side)
 Humerus (2)
 Pectoral girdle (shoulder)
 Scapula (2)                                                                    
 Clavicle (2)
 Lower arm bones (4 bones in total, 2 on each side) left bone
 Ulna (2)
 Radius (2)
 Hand (54 bones in total; 27 in each hand)
 Carpals
 Scaphoid bone (2)
 Lunate bone (2)
 Triquetral bone (2)
 Pisiform bone (2)
 Trapezium (2)
 Trapezoid bone (2)
 Capitate bone (2)
 Hamate bone (2)
 Metacarpals (10 bones in total; 5 on each side)
 Phalanges of the hand
 Proximal phalanges (10 bones in total; 5 on each side)
 Intermediate phalanges (8 bones in total; 4 on each side)
 Distal phalanges (10 bones in total; 5 on each side)

Pelvis (pelvic girdle)
The pelvis (or hip bone) is made up of three regions that have fused to form two coxal bones. They are the ilium, ischium, and pubis.

 The sacrum and coccyx attach to the two hip bones to form the pelvis, but are more important to the spinal column, where they are counted.
The pelvis is one of two bones used to determine the sex of a skeleton, which is determined by examining the size of the greater sciatic notch (also known as the pelvic opening).

Lower limb (thigh and leg) and foot
There are a total of 60 bones in the legs.
 Femur (2)
 Patella or kneecap (2)
 Tibia (2)
 Fibula (2)
 Foot (52 bones in total, 26 per foot)
Tarsus/Tarsals
Calcaneus or heel bone (2)
 Talus (2)
 Navicular bone (2)
 Medial cuneiform bone (2)
 Intermediate cuneiform bone (2)
 Lateral cuneiform bone (2)
 Cuboid bone (2)
 Metatarsals (10)
 Phalanges of the foot
 Proximal phalanges (10)
 Intermediate phalanges (8)
 Distal phalanges (10)

See also 
 List of skeletal muscles of the human body
 List of nerves of the human body
 Circulatory system
 Blood vessel

References 

List of bones of the human skeleton
Bones